The Jigme Dorji Wangchuk Memorial Gold Cup (formerly known as King's Cup) is an international football club tournament held in Bhutan. The inaugural edition was held in 2004, replacing the Federation Cup which was last played in 2002, which in turn has its origin traces back to its original name Jigme Dorji Wangchuck Memorial Gold Cup of the 1990s. The rebranded Jigme Dorji Wangchuck Memorial Gold Cup was revived in 2019.

Results

Top scorers

See also
Bhutan Football Federation
Football in Bhutan
Bhutan Premier League

References

 
Football competitions in Bhutan